Ariana was a general geographical term used by some Greek and Roman authors of the ancient period for a district of wide extent between Central Asia and the Indus River, comprising the eastern provinces of the Achaemenid Empire that covered the whole of modern-day Afghanistan, as well as the easternmost part of Iran and up to the Indus River in Pakistan. Ariana is the Latinized form of the Ancient Greek  , originating from the Old Persian word  (Ariana) meaning 'the Land of the Aryans', similar to the use of Āryāvarta. 

At various times, various parts of the region were governed by the Persians (the Achaemenids from 550 to 330 BC, the Sasanians from 275 to 650 AD and the Kushano-Sasanians from 345 to 450 AD), the Macedonians, the Seleucids from 330 to 305 BC, the Maurya Empire from 305 BC to 184 BC, then the Greco-Bactrians from and the Indo-Greeks from 155 to 90 BC), the Indo-Scythians from 90 BC to 20 AD, the Parthians from 160 BC to 225 AD including the Indo-Parthians from 20 to 225 AD and the Kushans from 110 BC to 225 AD, the Xionites (the Kidarites from 360 to 465 AD and the Hephthalites from 450 to 565 AD) and various other Huna peoples.

Etymology
The Greek term  (Latin: Ariana), a term found in Iranian Avestan  (especially in Airyanem Vaejah, the name of the Iranian peoples' mother country). The Greeks also referred to Haroyum/Haraiva (Herat) as Aria, which is one of the many provinces found in Ariana.

The names Ariana and Aria and many other ancient titles, of which Aria is a component element, are connected with the Avestan term , and the Old Persian term , a self-designation of the peoples of Ancient Iran and Ancient India, meaning 'noble', 'excellent' and 'honourable'.

Extent 
The exact limits of Ariana are laid down with little accuracy in classical sources. It seems to have been often confused (as in Pliny, Naturalis Historia, book vi, chapter 23) with the small province of Aria.

As a geographical term, Ariana was introduced by the Greek geographer, Eratosthenes (c. 276 BC – c. 195 BC) and was fully described by the Greek geographer Strabo (64/63 BC – ca. AD 24).

Per Eratosthenes' definition, the borders of Ariana were defined by the Indus River in the east, the sea in the south, a line from Carmania to the Caspian Gates (apparently referring to the pass near the southeastern edge of the Caspian Sea) in the west, and the so-called Taurus Mountains in the north. This large region included almost all of the countries east of Media and ancient Persia, including south of the great mountain ranges up to the deserts of Gedrosia and Carmania, i.e. the provinces of Carmania, Gedrosia, Drangiana, Arachosia, Aria, the Paropamisadae; also Bactria was reckoned to Ariana and was called "the ornament of Ariana as a whole" by Apollodorus of Artemita.

Strabo mentions that the Indus river flows between Ariana and India. He states that Ariana is bounded on the east by the Indus River, on the south by the great sea and that its parts on the west are marked by the same boundaries by which Parthia is separated from Media and Carmania from Paraetacenê and Persis.  After having described the boundaries of Ariana, Strabo writes that the name Αρειανή could also be extended to part of the Persians and the Medes and also to the northwards Bactrians and the Sogdians. A detailed description of that region is to be found in Strabo's Geographica, Book XV – "Persia, Ariana, the Indian subcontinent", chapter 2, sections 1–9. Dionysius Periegetes (1097) agrees with Strabo in extending the northern boundary of the Ariani to the Paropamisus, and (714) speaks of them as inhabiting the shores of the Erythraean Sea. It is probable, from Strabo (xv. p.724), that the term was extended to include the east Persians, Bactrians, and Sogdians, with the people of Ariana below the mountains, because they were for the most part of one speech.

By Herodotus Ariana is not mentioned, nor is it included in the geographical description of Stephanus of Byzantium and Ptolemy, or in the narrative of Arrian.

Inhabitants of Ariana 
The peoples by whom Ariana was inhabited, as enumerated by Strabo were:

 Arachoti;
 Arii;
 Bactrians;
 Drangae;
 Gedrosii;

 Paropamisadae;
 Parthians;
 Persians
 Sogdians.

Pliny (vi. 25) specifies the following ethnicities:

 Angutturi;
 Arii;
 the inhabitants of Daritis;
 Dorisci;
 Drangae;
 Evergetae;
 Gedrussi;

 Ichthyophagi;
 Methorici;
 Pasires;
 Urbi;
 Zarangae.

Rüdiger Schmitt, the German scholar of Iranian Studies, also believes that Ariana should have included other Iranian peoples. He writes in the Encyclopædia Iranica:

See also 
 Arianis
 Āryāvarta
 Avestan geography
 Greater Khorasan
 History of Afghanistan

References

Further reading 
 Horace Hayman Wilson, Charles Masson, Ariana Antiqua: a Descriptive Account of the Antiquities and Coins of Afghanistan, 1841
 Henry Walter Bellew, An inquiry into the ethnography of Afghanistan, 1891
 Tomaschek in Pauly-Wissowa, II/1, cols. 619f., and 813f.
 G. Gnoli, Postilla ad Ariyō šayana, RSO 41, 1966, pp. 329–34.
 P. Calmeyer, AMI 15, 1982, pp. 135ff.

External links 
The Online Etymology Dictionary: Aryana
'Ărĭāna', Charlton T. Lewis, Charles Short, A Latin Dictionary, Perseus Digital Library.
'Ariana', Dictionary of Greek and Roman geography, William Smith, 1870
'Stabo GeographyY', Book XV, Chapter 2.
Pliny the Elder, The Natural History, Chap. 23. (20.)—The Indus, Perseus Digital Library.
Pliny the Elder, The Natural History, Chap. 25.—The Ariani and the adjoining nations, Perseus Digital Library.
Pomponius Mela: De Chorographia Liber Primus
Ariana antiqua: a descriptive account of the antiquities and coins of Afghanistan  By Horace Hayman Wilson, Charles Masson
 Eratosthenes, Duane W. Roller, Strabo, 2010, 'Eratosthenes' Geography'

Historiography of Afghanistan
Historical regions of Iran
History of Zoroastrianism
History of Iranian peoples
Nomadic groups in Eurasia
Ancient Greek geography
Geographic history of Afghanistan
Historical regions